The 2016–17 Western Illinois Leathernecks men's basketball team represented Western Illinois University during the 2016–17 NCAA Division I men's basketball season. The Leathernecks, led by third-year head coach Billy Wright, played their home games at Western Hall in Macomb, Illinois as members of The Summit League. They finished the season 8–20, 5–11 in Summit League play to finish in eighth place. They lost in the quarterfinals of the Summit League tournament to South Dakota.

Previous season
The Leathernecks finished the 2015–16 season 10–17, 3–13 in Summit League play to finish in last place. As a result, they failed to qualify for The Summit League tournament.

Roster

Schedule and results

|-
!colspan=9 style=| Exhibition

|-
!colspan=9 style=| Non-conference regular season

|-
!colspan=9 style=| Summit League regular season 

|-
!colspan=9 style=| The Summit League tournament

References

Western Illinois Leathernecks men's basketball seasons
Western Illinois
Western
Western